CBS Records was a record label founded by CBS Corporation in 2006 to take advantage of music from its entertainment properties owned by CBS Studios. The initial label roster consisted of only three artists: rock band Señor Happy and singer/songwriters Will Dailey and P.J. Olsson.

The label relies primarily on digital distribution such as iTunes and on direct sales from its own website. However, it has signed a deal to distribute compact discs through RED Distribution, a subsidiary of Sony Music Entertainment which CBS Inc. formerly owned. CBS Records is headquartered at Television City in Los Angeles.

The "CBS Records" name was also used in the 1960s to release Columbia Records products outside the US and Canada. This was necessary because EMI owned another record label called Columbia, which operated in every market except North America, Spain and Japan. CBS sold the record company in 1988 to Sony. In 1991, the CBS label was officially renamed Columbia Records and the company was renamed Sony Music Entertainment.

Current roster

Artists 
 Will Dailey
 Keaton Simons
 Karmina
 Sharon Little
 P.J. Olsson
 Señor Happy
 The Wilshires
 You Are I Am

Soundtracks 
 NCIS

See also 
 List of record labels

References

External links 
 Official website

American record labels
Paramount Global subsidiaries
Pop record labels
Record labels established in 2006
Rock record labels